Irakli Georgievitch Dzhandzhgava (born 21 January 1964) is a former Russian football goalkeeper.

Club career
Born in Krasnodar, Russian SSR, Soviet Union, Dzhandzhgava played with FC Kuban Krasnodar, FC SKA Rostov-on-Don in the Soviet Second League. He also played with FC Sokol Saratov and FC Druzhba Maykop before moving abroad in 1990.  He moved to Yugoslavia, to Montenegro, and after playing one season with FK Lovćen, he played with FK Mogren in the 1991–92 Yugoslav Second League.

References

1964 births
Living people
People from Krasnodar
Russian footballers
Soviet footballers
Soviet expatriate footballers
Association football goalkeepers
FC Kuban Krasnodar players
FC Sokol Saratov players
FK Lovćen players
FK Mogren players
Expatriate footballers in Yugoslavia
Soviet expatriate sportspeople in Yugoslavia
FC SKA Rostov-on-Don players